Nine Night is a 2018 play by Natasha Gordon. It focuses on the traditional Jamaican Nine nights, as a family struggles with their loss.

Productions 
Nine Night had its world premiere production at Dorfman Theatre beginning on 21 April 2018, playing a limited run to 21 May. The production transferred to the West End, beginning previews at Trafalgar Studios on 1 December 2018 prior to opening night on 6 December. Playwright Natasha Gordon stepped into the role of Lorraine. The production played a limited run to 23 February.

Critical reception 
The play received generally positive reviews. Paul Taylor for The Independent states "Natasha Gordon's debut play buzzes with comic energy...The piece generates a fantastic atmosphere of inclusion. Natasha Gordon is an actress, but I have no doubt that from now on, we will be hearing a lot more from her as a dramatist." In a five star review for the Evening Standard, Henry Hitchings states "Right now there’s probably no funnier performance in town than Cecilia Noble as Aunt Maggie, the clucking matriarch in Natasha Gordon’s richly enjoyable family drama."

Awards and nominations

References 

2018 plays
English plays